VH1 is a music channel in Denmark operated by Paramount Networks EMEAA. The channel launched at 22:00 on 15 March 2008, replacing VH1 Europe.

Background
Before the launch of VH1 Denmark, VH1 was first made available in Denmark through VH1 UK followed by VH1 Export and later VH1 Europe.

Availability
Initially, upon launch, the channel had limited availability. However, 
YouSee, offered VH1 Denmark as a replacement to the timeshare between the channel's Pan-European equivalent VH1 Europe and the erotic channel Private Blue. The smaller cable network Stofa and Telia also offered the channel upon launch. Both satellite distributors, Canal Digital and Viasat, did not broadcast the Danish channel, continuing their relays of VH1 Europe instead.

From launch, the channel had dedicated Danish programming for the channel including a weekly chart show hosted by the radio personality Dan Rachlin. The channel continues to present a mix of local music along with music from the Nordic countries, US and the UK. Countdown shows, playlist shows and specialist music content.

Upon launch, the channel was broadcasting between 12 p.m. and 6 a.m. In the morning, Nickelodeon was broadcasting instead. At the start of 2009, Nickelodeon began its own frequency in the YouSee network and VH1 up to 20 hours a day with teleshopping making up the remainder of the schedule.

The channel launched on the terrestrial Boxer platform on 1 November 2009.

Programming
 00s Rock Anthems! Top 20
 100% Xmas
 20 Biggest 20s Hits
 20 Greatest Dance Anthems Of The 10s!
 3. Søndag i Advent
 50 Biggest 20s Hits
 50 Hits Til Julefrokosten
 50 R&B Throwbacks!
 50 Songs To Fall In Love To
 80s Girls Just Wanna Have Fun! Top 50
 90s Hip Hop! Top 20
 Artist: Big 10
 Best Of Danish!
 Best Of Danish: Xmas Hits! Top 10
 Christmas Classics: Top 20
 Countdown to Christmas: X Days To Go
 Debut Hits! Top 20
 Fierce Females
 Fierce Females! Artist x Artist
 Friday Night Party Hits!
 Global Video Premiere: Artist
 Guess The Year
 Happy Birthday Artist!
 Hits Don't Lie
 Julens Favoritter
 Love Ballads: Top 20
 Party Tunes Tuesday!
 Party Tunes Tuesday! Top 50
 Party Warm Up! Top 50
 Pop Battle: Artist vs Artist
 Superstar Battle! Artist vs Artist
 The 40 Greatest Christmas Songs
 The Official Airplay Top 20
 The Official Album Top 10
 The Official Track Top 20
 The Official Track Top 50 Of Year
 Throwback Thursday!
 Top 50 Funniest Music Videos
 Top 50 Girl Power Anthems!
 Top 50 Greatest 00s Hits!
 Top 50 Greatest 80s Party Hits!
 Top 50 Greatest 90s Hits!
 Top 50 Greatest Power Ballads
 VH1 Classics
 VH1 Julemix
 VH1 Love: Artist vs Artist
 VH1 Weekly Hotlist 
 VH1 Weekly Top 20
 VH1's House Party Hits!
 Wake Up With VH1
 Workout Hits!

Presenters
 Dan Rachlin (2008-2015)

References

Television stations in Denmark
Television channels and stations established in 2008
2008 establishments in Denmark
Television channels and stations disestablished in 2020
2020 disestablishments in Denmark
VH1
Music organizations based in Denmark